"Wasting My Time" is a song by Canadian rock band Default for their first studio album, The Fallout (2001). It was released as their debut single on August 28, 2001. The song was written by the members of the band and produced by Chad Kroeger and Rick Parashar. "Wasting My Time" is Default's most commercially successful song, having reached number 13 on the Billboard Hot 100 chart on June 8, 2002, and numbers two and three, respectively, on the US Mainstream Rock and Modern Rock airplay charts, just behind Puddle of Mudd's "Blurry" on the former chart. It was also their first of three singles to top the Canadian rock airplay chart.

Composition
"Wasting My Time" was written by Default (Dallas Smith, Jeremy Hora, Dave Benedict, and Danny Craig) and was produced by Chad Kroeger and Rick Parashar. The song is a power ballad that draws on influences of various rock genres and lasts for four minutes and twenty-nine seconds. According to the sheet music published by EMI Music Publishing, it is set in common time to a "moderate rock" tempo of 120 BPM. "Wasting My Time" was originally composed in the key of D major and follows a chord progression of D–G in the verses and G–B–G–A in the chorus. Smith's vocal range on the track spans one full octave, from A to A.

Musically, the song features melodic verses of singing and clean, bright guitar picking. This moves into a hard-hitting, wailing chorus and a distorted guitar solo as the interlude. Eric Aiese of Billboard described the song as having an "early-90s grunge sound" while also noting the influence of alternative rock in its production. The song's lyrics find the narrator contemplating if he is wasting his time investing in a dead-end relationship.

Music video
A music video was filmed for the song and centers around a woman waiting for her companion. They finally meet at the end and embrace. Band performance fills the majority of the video and takes place in the woman's wrist watch, with the top part showing the city show through glass with the watch hands rotating around the band. The video contains scenes shot in downtown Toronto, Ontario outside the Westin Harbour Castle. It was directed by Noble Jones and premiered on August 7, 2001. The video has a guest appearance by Chad Kroeger in a scene where one man was fighting or struggling against three others.

Track listings

Usage in media
"Wasting My Time" was featured on the soundtrack to Is It College Yet?, a movie-length installment of the MTV animated series, Daria.

Charts

Weekly charts

Year end charts

Release history

Notes

References

2000s ballads
2001 debut singles
2001 songs
Default (band) songs
Island Records singles
Rock ballads
Song recordings produced by Rick Parashar
Songs written by Dallas Smith
TVT Records singles